Diana was a whaling ship built in 1840, in Bremen, Germany. She sailed out of Hull, England. In 1858 a steam engine was installed, making her the first steam-powered whaler to sail from Hull (Tay from Dundee was the first ever, a year earlier). Records held in Kingston upon Hull, claimed that the steam engine was installed in Diana in 1857, and, according to Dundee websites, in Tay in 1859.

Trapped in the ice

In 1866, while on a whaling expedition in Baffin Bay, Diana became frozen in the ice, where it was trapped for over six months. The ship's captain, 64-year-old John Gravill, and many of the crew died. The diary of the ship's doctor, Charles Edward Smith, was published in the book From the Deep of the Sea.. After the death of the Gravill, the ice-master George Clarke takes command of the ship and William Lofley navigates the Diana to Lerwick. There is a memorial fountain to Diana'''s return from the ice in the town of Lerwick in the Shetland Islands, as many of the crew originated from the islands and all the deceased except the captain were buried there.  Charles Smith's services and heroism were recognised by the award of a set of surgical instruments from the Board of Trade.  Captain Gravill's body was taken back to Hull, and his funeral was attended by an estimated fifteen thousand people.

Fate
On 20 October 1869, while making her way back from the Davis Strait, Diana encountered a strong gale, and was washed into the Donna Nook sands, on the Lincolnshire coast, and broke up. Her crew were rescued by the lifeboat North Briton. Diana was the last whaling ship from the port of Hull. Her loss ended the whaling industry of the city.

Captains
This is a partial list of Captains of Diana'':
 John Gravill Sr. (1856–57, 1861, 1865-1867 [died on board])
 George Clarke (14 February 1867 – 16 April 1867) (Elected Captain after the death of John Graville whilst the ship beset in the ice)
 John Gravill Jr. (1858–60)
 William Wells (1863)
 Robert Day (16 April 1867-Loss)

See also
 Whaling in the United Kingdom

References

External links
 
Hullwebs History of Hull

Whaling ships
Barques
Age of Sail ships of the United Kingdom
Fishing vessels of the United Kingdom
Shipwrecks in the North Sea
Baffin Bay
Maritime incidents in October 1869
History of Lincolnshire
Ships built in Bremen (state)
1840 ships
History of Kingston upon Hull
History of Shetland
Ships built in Germany